Cornelis Van Dam is a Canadian Old Testament scholar. He was professor of Old Testament at Canadian Reformed Theological Seminary from 1981 to 2011.

Van Dam holds degrees from Wilfrid Laurier University, Canadian Reformed Theological Seminary, Knox College at the University of Toronto, and the Theological University of Kampen.

In 2011, a Festschrift was published in his honour. Living Waters from Ancient Springs: Essays in Honor of Cornelis Van Dam includes contributions from Hans Boersma and Al Wolters.

References

Canadian biblical scholars
Old Testament scholars
Canadian Calvinist and Reformed theologians
Theological University of the Reformed Churches alumni
Wilfrid Laurier University alumni
University of Toronto alumni

Living people
Year of birth missing (living people)